Parker Ito (born 1986) is a contemporary artist. He is fourth generation Japanese American, or Yonsei, living and working in Los Angeles.

Life
Parker Ito was born in 1986 in Long Beach, California, and was raised there. When Ito was younger, he acted and sang on television. Before becoming a professional artist, he aspired to become a professional skateboarder and held a job painting oil derricks in Los Angeles.

Art practice

Ito creates paintings, sculptures and video works by drawing upon his experience online as both artist and audience. In promotion for Ito's residency at MGM Resorts in Las Vegas, art critic and curator Nicolas Bourriaud wrote of Ito's work, “The works of ... Parker Ito have no origin, no source code. They are made in the form of circuits – they proliferate and surge.”

Production
One element of Ito's working style involves hiring paid assistants to produce works. He insists on paying them a fair wage and allows for the produced works to be made in the style of the hired hand. This strategy was used in his body of work The Most Infamous Girl in the History of the Internet, a project created while he was still attending California College of the Arts in Oakland. For this work, a popular stock photo which features a young girl wearing a backpack on a college campus was manually reproduced and manipulated through painting in several different styles and interpretations. The lack of a cohesive visual style has become synonymous with Ito's practice.

The use of hired hands was also notably used to produce the works shown at White Cube gallery in London for his exhibition Part 2: Nora Berman, Blackwidow LA, Parker Cheeto, Carey Garris, Justin John Greene, Celia Hollander, Daniel Lane, Lee Marshall and Orion Martin: Maid in Heaven / En Plein Air in Hell (My Beautiful Dark and Twisted Cheeto Problem), 2014. In this show, all of his assistants received credit as artists, leading people to believe it was a group exhibition.

Conceptual concerns
Ito has said that he is not concerned about maintaining ownership over ideas or stylistic decisions in a period where information sharing is ubiquitous. He is a champion of the Internet and believes that the spreading of ideas is the primary purpose of its existence.

Critical reception
While Ito has received some positive reception – Chris Kraus called a 2015 exhibition "a stunning, vertiginous private museum multiplied hundreds of times" – other critics have been less positive. Oliver Basciano for ArtReview described a 2014 exhibition as "I came to the conclusion that I really couldn’t give a shit...A thoughtful meditation on neoliberal politics and the dispossessed."

Career
Parker Ito is represented by Château Shatto, a Los Angeles-based art gallery owned by Olivia Barrett, Ito's relationship partner and dealer, and Beijing Art Now Gallery in Beijing, China. Recent solo exhibitions by the artist include CONDO, hosted by Sadie Coles HQ, London; P, Primary, Nottingham; P, Team Gallery, New York; #17, Beijing Art Now Gallery, Beijing; A Lil Taste of Cheeto in the Night, Château Shatto, Los Angeles; Maid in Heaven / En Plein Air in Hell, White Cube, London. Previous group exhibitions include Welcome Too Late, Kunsthal Charlottenburg, Copenhagen; LA Dreams, CFHILL, Stockholm; Bodacious, Museum of Contemporary Art, Denver; Times Museum, Guangzhou; Co-Workers, Musée d’Art Moderne de la Ville de Paris; TERRAFORMERS, Bonington Gallery, Nottingham; The Heart is a Lonely Hunter, Yarat Contemporary Art Space, Baku; Wet Paint, Institute of Contemporary Arts, London; and Everythings, Andrea Rosen, New York. In addition Ito has collaborated with other artists, such as Body by Body (Melissa Sachs, Cameron Soren).

Art market
Franklin Melendez writes "...in Parker Ito’s contentious relationship to the art market... Boasted as its champion or derided as a harbinger of its collapse, Parker has remained tethered to its ebb and flow in most critical discussions of his work. Granted, this is far from incidental, as his production model willfully undermines (or at least fucks with) the market’s standing currencies: deliberately hyper-producing, refusing to subscribe to the usual signs of authenticity (like signatures), or exploding them to monumental proportions until they too become another visual motif."

Ito has had several  exhibitions at gallery Chateau Shatto. In these he included drawings, installations, videos, and art&science works. 

Parker Ito was one of 30 or so emerging artists that were associated with Stefan Simchowitz. Simchowitz met Ito in 2012, alongside Jon Rafman, Petra Cortright and Artie Vierkant, saying “In all of these guys, I identified the makings of a movement.” Simchowitz claims he was Ito's first client, purchasing a painting from him when the artist was 22 for $750, and flipping it for $1500.

Ito's work experienced a rapid increase in value, peaking in February 2014 at $93,594, significantly higher than the high estimate of $25,000. In July 2014 a work sold for $80,000, but in the year after that, his auction results averaged $30,000 per or had works unsold. More recently, his works at auction have mostly had high estimates around or under $10,000, and have gone as low as 2,700 GBP, which was under the low estimate of 4,000 GBP.

During the period leading up to his 2014 auction high, Ito's relationship with Simchowitz became an art-world controversy. Currently, Ito is actively distancing himself from him.

Ito’s work is in public and private collections around the world, including the Musée d’Art Moderne de la Ville de Paris, Paris; Henry Art Gallery, Seattle; Getty Research Institute; Sifang Art Museum, Nanjing; Yuz Museum, Shanghai; Sandretto Foundation, Turin; Aishti Foundation, Beirut; and PCP Collection, Taipei.

See also 
 Post-Internet

References

External links 
 Parker Ito’s Website
 Parker Ito’s Youtube Channel
 Parker Ito, Château Shatto
 The Agony and the Ecstasy, Stadium Gallery
 Maid in Heaven / En Plein Air in Hell (My Beautiful Dark and Twisted Cheeto Problem), ArtReview
 I Like the Direct Experience of Documentation: A Conversation with Artie Vierkant and Parker Ito, ArtPulse
 Saltz on Stefan Simchowitz, the Greatest Art-Flipper of Them All, Vulture

1986 births
People from Ventura, California
Artists from Los Angeles
Date of birth missing (living people)
Living people
20th-century American painters
American installation artists
American contemporary painters
21st-century American painters